Invitation to a Murder is a 2023 American murder mystery film directed by Stephen Shimek and starring Mischa Barton, Chris Browning, Bianca A. Santos, and Giles  Matthey. It is scheduled to be released by Lionsgate on April 25, 2023.

Cast

Production
Production began in late 2021.

Release
The film is scheduled for digital release on 25 April 2023 through Lionsgate.

References

External links

2023 films
American mystery films
Films set in 1934
Films set in England
Lionsgate films
2020s mystery films
Upcoming films